Arnold Uhrlass (born October 19, 1931) is an American former speed skater and cyclist. He competed in two events at the 1960 Winter Olympics and in the team pursuit event at the 1964 Summer Olympics.

See also
 List of athletes who competed in both the Summer and Winter Olympic games

References

External links
 

1931 births
Living people
American male cyclists
American male speed skaters
Olympic cyclists of the United States
Olympic speed skaters of the United States
Speed skaters at the 1960 Winter Olympics
Cyclists at the 1964 Summer Olympics
People from Yonkers, New York
American track cyclists